Catholic Electoral Action, abbreviated as WAK, was a right-wing electoral committee that participated in the 1991 Polish parliamentary election. The committee's members belonged to the Christian democratic and national conservative Christian National Union. Led by Wiesław Chrzanowski, Catholic Electoral Action won 49 seats in the Sejm and 9 seats in Senat during the 1991 poll. The committee enjoyed quasi support from the Roman Catholic Church and received relatively strong support in rural areas. Following the election's conclusion, the Christian National Union disbanded its nom de guerre Catholic Electoral Action, sitting in parliament under the party's actual name.

References

1990 establishments in Poland
1991 disestablishments in Poland
Catholic political parties
Christian democratic parties in Europe
Conservative parties in Poland
Defunct political parties in Poland
Political parties disestablished in 1991
Political parties established in 1990
National Democracy